Perovskite nanocrystals are a class of semiconductor nanocrystals, which exhibit unique characteristics that separate them from traditional quantum dots. Perovskite nanocrystals have an ABX3 composition where A = cesium, methylammonium (MA), or formamidinium (FA); B = lead or tin; and X = chloride, bromide, or iodide.

Their unique qualities largely involve their unusual band-structure which renders these materials effectively defect tolerant or able to emit brightly without surface passivation.  This is in contrast to other quantum dots such as CdSe which must be passivated with an epitaxially matched shell to be bright emitters. In addition to this, lead-halide perovskite nanocrystals remain bright emitters when the size of the nanocrystal imposes only weak quantum confinement. This enables the production of nanocrystals that exhibit narrow emission linewidths regardless of their polydispersity.

The combination of these attributes and their easy-to-perform synthesis has resulted in numerous articles demonstrating the use of perovskite nanocrystals as both classical and quantum light sources with considerable commercial interest. Perovskite nanocrystals have been applied to numerous other optoelectronic applications such as light emitting diodes, lasers, visible communication, scintillators, solar cells, and photodetectors.

Physical properties 
Perovskite nanocrystals possess numerous unique attributes: defect tolerance, high quantum yield, fast rates of radiative decay and narrow emission line width in weak confinement, which make them ideal candidates for a variety of optoelectronic applications.

Bulk vs. nano 
The intriguing optoelectronic properties of lead halide perovskites were first studied in single crystals and thin films.: From these reports, it was discovered that these materials possess high carrier mobility, long carrier lifetimes, long carrier diffusion lengths, and small effective carrier masses. Unlike their nanocrystal counterparts, bulk ABX3 materials are non-luminescent at room temperature, but they do exhibit bright photoluminescence once cooled to cryogenic temperatures.

Defect-tolerance 
Contrary to the characteristics of other colloidal quantum dots such as CdSe, ABX3 QDs are shown to be bright, high quantum yield (above 80%) and stable emitters with narrow linewidths without surface passivation. In II-VI systems, the presence of dangling bonds on the surface results in photoluminescence quenching and photoluminescent intermittence or blinking. The lack of sensitivity to the surface can be rationalized from the electronic band structure and density of states calculations for these materials. Unlike conventional II-VI semiconductors where the band gap is formed by bonding and antibonding orbitals, the frontier orbitals in ABX3 QDs are formed by antibonding orbitals composed of Pb 6s 6p and X np orbitals (n is the principle quantum number for the corresponding halogen atom).   As a result, dangling bonds (under-coordinated atoms) result in intraband states or shallow traps instead of deep mid-gap states (e.g. d in CdSe QDs. This observation was corroborated by computational studies which demonstrated that the electronic structure of CsPbX3 materials exhibits a trap-free band gap.  Furthermore, band structure calculations performed by various groups have demonstrated that these are direct band gap materials at their R-point (a critical point of the Brillouin zone) with a composition dependent band gaps.

Photoluminescence 
The change in band-gap with composition can be described by Vegard's Law, which describes the change in lattice parameter as a function of the change in composition for a solid solution. However, the change in lattice parameter can be rewritten to describe the change in band gap for many semiconductors. The change in band gap directly affects the energy or wavelength of light that can be absorbed by the material and therefore its color. Furthermore, this directly alters the energy of emitted light according to the Stokes shift of the material. This quick, post-synthetic anion-tunability is in contrast to other quantum dot systems where emission wavelength is primarily tuned through particle size by altering the degree of quantum confinement.

Aside from tuning the absorption edge and emission wavelength by anion substitution, it was also observed that the A-site cation also affects both properties. This occurs as a result of the distortion of the perovskite structure and the tilting of octahedra due to the size of the A-cation.  Cs, which yields a Goldschmidt tolerance factor of less than one, results in a distorted, orthorhombic structure at room temperature. This results in reduced orbital overlap between the halide and lead atoms and blue shifts the absorption and emission spectra.  On the other hand, FA yields a cubic structure and results in FAPbX3 having red shifted absorption and emission spectra as compared to both Cs and MA.  Of these three cations, MA is intermediate size between Cs and FA and therefore results in absorption and emission spectra intermediate between those of Cs and FA. Through the combination of both anionic and cationic tuning, the whole spectrum ranging from near-UV to near-IR can be covered.

Absorption Coefficient 
Recent studies have demonstrated that CsPbBr3 nanocrystals have an absorption coefficient of 2x105 cm−1 at 335 nm and 8x104 cm−1 at 400 nm.

Single Dot Spectroscopy of Perovskite Nanocrystals

Blinking and Spectral diffusion 
Spectroscopic studies of individual nanocrystals have revealed blinking-free emission and very low spectral diffusion without a passivating shell around the NCs. Studies have also demonstrated blinking-free emission at room temperature with a strongly reduced Auger recombination rate at room temperature (CsPbI3 NCs).

Exciton fine-structure and the Rashba effect 
It was observed that emission from perovskite nanocrystals may be the result of a bright (optically active) triplet state. Several effects have been suggested to play a role on the exciton fine structure such as electron-hole exchange interactions, crystal field and shape anisotropy, as well as the Rashba effect. While it has been reported that the Rashba effect contributes to the existence of a lowest energy triplet state , recent work on  has indicated the presence of a lower lying dark state, which can be activated with the application of a magnetic field.

Coherent emission 
Numerous quantum optical technologies require coherent light sources. Perovskite nanocrystals have been demonstrated as sources of such light as well as suitable materials for the generation of single photons with high coherence.

Self-assembly and Superfluorescence 
Monodisperse perovskite nanocrystals can be assembled into cubic superlattices, which can range from a few hundreds of nanometers to tens of microns in size and show tunable photoluminescence by changing nanocrystal composition via anion exchange (for example, from green-emitting CsPbBr3 nanocrystal superlattices to yellow and orange emitting  nanocrystal superlattices to red-emitting CsPbI3 ones). These superlattices have been reported to exhibit very high degree of structural order and unusual optical phenomena such as superfluorescence. In the case of these superlattices, it was reported that the dipoles of the individual nanocrystals can become aligned and then simultaneously emit several pulses of light.

Chemical properties

Synthesis 
Early attempts were made to prepare MAPbX3 perovskites as nanocrystals in 2014 by non-template synthesis. It was not until 2015 that CsPbX3 nanocrystals were prepared by the Kovalenko research group at ETH Zurich. by a hot-injection synthesis. Since then numerous other synthetic routes towards the successful preparation of ABX3 NCs have been demonstrated.

Hot-injection 
The majority of papers reporting on ABX3 NCs make use of a hot injection procedure in which one of the reagents is swiftly injected into a hot solution containing the other reagents and ligands. The combination of high temperature and rapid addition of the reagent result in a rapid reaction that results in supersaturation and nucleation occurring over a very short period of time with a large number of nuclei. After a short period of time, the reaction is quenched by quickly cooling to room temperature. Since 2015, several articles detailing improvements to this approach with zwitterionic ligands, branched ligands and post-synthetic treatments have been reported. Recently, soy-lecithin was demonstrated to be a ligand system for these nanocrystals that could stabilize concentrations from several ng/mL up to 400 mg/mL.

Co-precipitation 
A second, popular method for the preparation of ABX3 NCs relies on the ionic nature of APbX3 materials. Briefly, a polar, aprotic solvent such as DMF or DMSO is used to dissolve the starting reagents such as PbBr2, CsBr, oleic acid, and an amine. The subsequent addition of this solution into a non-polar solvent reduces the polarity of the solution and causes precipitation of the ABX3 phase.

Microfluidics 
Microfluidics have been also used to synthesize CsPbX3 NCs and to screen and study synthetic parameters.  Recently, a modular microfluidic platform has been developed at North Carolina State University to further optimize the synthesis and composition of these materials.

Other routes 
Outside of the traditional synthetic routes, several papers have reported that CsPbX3 NCs could be prepared on supports or within porous structures even without ligands. Dirin et al. first demonstrated that bright NCs of CsPbX3  could be prepared without organic ligands within the pores of mesoporous silica. By using mesoporous silica as a template, the size of CsPbX3 nanodomains is restricted to the pore size.  This allows for greater control over emission wavelength via quantum confinement and illustrates the defect tolerant nature of these materials. This concept was later extended to the preparation of ligand-free APbX3 NCs on alkali-halide supports that could be shelled with NaBr without deteriorating their optical properties and protecting the nanocrystals against a number of polar solvents.

As a result of the low melting point and ionic nature of ABX3 materials, several studies have demonstrated that bright ABX3 nanocrystals can also be prepared by ball-milling.

With NCs, the composition can be tuned via ion exchange i.e. the ability to post-synthetically exchange the ions in the lattice for those added. This has been shown to be possible for both anions and cations.

Anion exchange 
The anions in the lead halide perovskites are highly mobile. The mobility arises from the diffusion of halide vacancies throughout the lattice, with an activation barrier of 0.29 eV and 0.25 eV for CsPbCl3 and CsPbBr3 respectively. (see: physical properties). This was used by Nedelcu et al. and Akkerman et al., to demonstrate that the composition of cesium lead halide perovskite nanocrystals could be tuned continuously from CsPbCl3 to CsPbBr3 and from CsPbBr3 to CsPbI3 to obtain emission across the entire visible spectrum. While this was first observed in a colloidal suspension, this was also shown in solid pellets of alkali halide salts pressed with previously synthesized nanocrystals. This same phenomenon has also been observed for MAPbX3 and FAPbX3 NCs.

Cation exchange and doping 
Although several reports showed that CsPbX3 NCs could be doped with Mn2+, they accomplished this through the addition of the Mn precursor during the synthesis, and not through cation exchange. Cation exchange can be used to partially exchange Pb2+ with Sn2+, Zn2+, or Cd2+ over the course of several hours. In addition to these cations, gold was also shown to be a suitable candidate for cation exchange yielding a mixed-valent, and distorted, perovskite with the composition Cs2Au(I)Au(III)Br6. A-site cation exchange has also been shown to be a viable route for the transformation of CsPbBr3 to MAPbBr3 and from CsPbI3 to FAPbI3.

Ligand-assisted reprecipitation (LARP) 

Ligand-assisted reprecipitation method is dedicated for the preparation of perovskite nanoplatelets (NPls). In this method, the precursors in different solvents whether polar like Dimethylformamide and Dimethyl sulfoxide or non-polar like toluene and hexane are added in the presence of the ligands to form the perovskite NPls theough supersaturation. The NPls thickness obtained from this method depends on the concentration of the ligands as well as the chain length of the organic ligands. Therefore, the thickness can be controlled by ratio between A-cation-oleate and lead-halide precursors in the reaction medium. By adjusting the toluene and acetone during the synthesis, the NPls are crystallized and precipitated at room temperature with these two solvents, respectively.

Morphology 
Nanomaterials can be prepared with various morphologies that range from spherical particles/quantum wells (0D) to wires (1D) and platelets or sheets (2D), and this has been previously demonstrated for QDs such as CdSe. While the initial report of lead halide perovskite NCs covered cubic particles, subsequent reports demonstrated that these materials could also be prepared as both platelets (2D) and wires (1D). Due to the varying degrees of quantum confinement present in these different shapes, the optical properties (emission spectrum and mean lifetime) change. As an example of the effect of morphology, cubic nanocrystals of CsPbBr3 can emit from 470 nm to 520 nm based on their size (470 nm emission requires nanocrystals with an average diameter of less than 4 nm). Within this same composition (CsPbBr3), nanoplatelets exhibit emission that is blue shifted from that of cubes with the wavelength depending on the number of monolayers contained within the platelet (from 440 nm for three monolayers to 460 nm for 5 monolayers). Nanowires of CsPbBr3, on the other hand, emit from 473 nm to 524 nm depending on the width of the wire prepared with lifetimes also in the range of 2.5 ns – 20.6 ns.

Similarly to CsPbBr3, MAPbBr3 NCs also exhibit morphologically dependent optical properties with nanocrystals of MAPbBr3 emitting from 475 nm to 520 nm and exhibiting average lifetimes on the order of 240 ns depending on their composition. Nanoplatelets and nanowires have been reported to emit at 465 nm and 532 nm, respectively.

Structure and composition 
Perovskite nanocrystals all have the general composition ABX3 in which A is a large, central cation (typically MA, FA, or Cs) that sits in a cavity surrounded by corner-sharing BX6 octahedra (B = Pb, Sn; X = Cl, Br, I). Depending on the composition, the crystal structure can vary from orthorhombic to cubic, and the stability of a given composition can be qualitatively predicted by its goldschmidt tolerance factor

where t is the calculated tolerance factor and r is the ionic radius of the A, B, and X ions, respectively. Structures with tolerance factors between 0.8 and 1 are expected to have cubic symmetry and form three dimensional perovskite structures such as those observed in CaTiO3. Furthermore, tolerance factors of t > 1 yield hexagonal structures (CsNiBr3 type), and t < 0.8 result in NH4CdCl3 type structures. If the A-site cation is too large (t >1), but packs efficiently, 2D perovskites can be formed.

Distortions and Phase transitions 
The corner-sharing BX6 octahedra form a three-dimensional framework through bridging halides. The angle (Φ) formed by B-X-B (metal-halide-metal) can be used to judge the closeness of a given structure to that of an ideal perovskite. Although these octahedra are interconnected and form a framework, the individual octahedra are able to tilt with respect to one another. This tilting is affected by the size of the "A" cation as well as external stimuli such as temperature or pressure.

If the B-X-B angle deviates too far from 180°, phase transitions towards non-luminescent or all-together non-perovskite phases can occur. If the B-X-B angle does not deviate very far from 180°, the overall structure of the perovskite remains as a 3D network of interconnected octahedra, but the optical properties may change. This distortion increases the band gap of the material as the overlap between Pb and X based orbitals is reduced. For example, changing the A cation from Cs to MA or FA alters the tolerance factor and decreases the band gap as the B-X-B bond angle approaches 180° and the orbital overlap between the lead and halide atoms increases. These distortions can further manifest themselves as deviations in the band gap from that expected by Vegard's Law for solid solutions.

Crystal structure and twinning in nanocrystals 
The room temperature crystal structures of the various bulk lead-halide perovskites have been extensively studied and have been reported for the APbX3 perovskites. The average crystal structures of the nanocrystals tend to agree with those of the bulk. Studies have, however, shown that these structures are dynamic and deviate from the predicted structures due to the presence of twinned nanodomains.

Surface chemistry 
Calculations as well as empirical observations have demonstrated that perovskite nanocrystals are defect-tolerant semiconductor materials.  As a result, they do not require epitaxial shelling or surface passivation since they are insensitive to surface defect states. In general, the perovskite nanocrystal surface is considered to be both ionic and highly dynamic. Initial reports utilized dynamically bound oleylammonium and oleate ligands that exhibited an equilibrium between bound and unbound states. This resulted in severe instability with respect to purification and washing, which was improved in 2018 with the introduction of zwitterionic ligands.  The stability and quality of these colloidal materials was further improved in 2019 when it was demonstrated that deep traps could be generated by the partial destruction of the lead-halide octahedra, and that they could also be subsequently repaired to restore the quantum yield of nanocrystals.

Applications and Devices

Light-emitting Diodes 
Perovskite NCs are promising materials for the emitting layer of light-emitting diodes (LEDs) as they offer potential advantages over organic LEDs (OLEDs) such as the elimination of precious metals (Ir, Pt) and simpler syntheses. The first report of green electroluminescence (EL) was from MAPbBr3 NCs although no efficiency values were reported. It was later observed that MAPbBr3 NCs could form in a polymer matrix when the precursors for MAPbBr3 thin films were mixed with an aromatic polyidmide precursor. The authors of this study obtained green EL with an external quantum efficiency (EQE) of up to 1.2%.

The first LEDs based on colloidal CsPbX3 NCs demonstrated blue, green and orange EL with sub-1% EQE. Since then, efficiencies have reached above 8% for green LEDs (CsPbBr3 NCs), above 7% for red LEDs (CsPbI3 NCs), and above 1% for blue LEDs ).

Lasers 
Perovskite MAPbX3 thin films have been shown to be promising materials for optical gain applications such as lasers and optical amplifiers. Afterwards, the lasing properties of  colloidal perovskite NCs such as CsPbX3 nanocubes, MAPbBr3 nanoplatelets and FAPbX3 nanocubes were also demonstrated. Thresholds as low as 2 uJ cm−2 have been reported for colloidal NCs (CsPbX3) and 220 nJ cm−2 for MAPbI3 nanowires. Interestingly, perovskite NCs show efficient optical gain properties not only under resonant excitation, but also under two-photon excitation where the excitation light falls into the transparent range of the active material. While the nature of optical gain in perovskites is not yet clearly understood, the dominant hypothesis is that the population inversion of excited states required for gain appears to be due to bi-excitonic states in the perovskite.

Photocatalysis
Perovskite nanocrystals have also been investigated as potential photocatalysts.

Security 
Perovskite nanocrystals doped with large cations such as ethylene diamine (en) were demonstrated to exhibit hypsochromaticity concomitantly with lengthened photoluminescence lifetimes relative to their undoped counterparts. This phenomenon was utilized by researchers to generate single color luminescent QR codes that could only be deciphered by measuring the photoluminescence lifetime. The lifetime measurements were carried out utilizing both time correlated single photon counting equipment as well as a prototype time-of-flight fluorescence imaging device developed by CSEM.

Other phases 
Ternary cesium lead halides have multiple stable phases that can be formed; these include CsPbX3 (perovskite),  Cs4PbX6 (so called "zero-dimensional" phase due to disconnected [PbX6]4- octahedra), and CsPb2X5. All three phases have been prepared colloidally either by a direct synthesis or via nanocrystal transformations.

A rising research interest in these compounds created a disagreement within the community around the zero-dimensional Cs4PbBr6 phase. Two contradicting claims exist regarding the optical properties of this material: i) the phase exhibits high photoluminescent quantum yield emission at 510-530 nm and ii) the phase is non-luminescent in the visible spectrum.  It was later demonstrated that pure, Cs4PbBr6 NCs were non-luminescent, and that these could be converted to luminescent CsPbX3 NCs and vice versa.

A similar debate had occurred regarding the CsPb2Br5 phase, which was also reported as being strongly luminescent.  This phase, like the Cs4PbBr6 phase, is a wide gap semiconductor (~3.1 eV), but it is also an indirect-semiconductor and is non-luminescent. The non-luminescent nature of this phase was further demonstrated in NH4Pb2Br5.

Lead-free perovskite nanocrystals 
Given the toxicity of lead, there is ongoing research into the discovery of lead-free perovskites for optoelectronics. Several lead-free perovskites have been prepared colloidally: Cs3Bi2I9, Cs2PdX6,  CsSnX3. CsSnX3 NCs, although the closest lead-free analogue to the highly luminescent CsPbX3 NCs, do not exhibit high quantum yields (<1% PLQY)  CsSnX3 NCs are also sensitive towards O2 which causes oxidation of Sn(II) to Sn(IV) and renders the NCs non-luminescent.

Another approach to this problem relies on the replacement of the Pb(II) cation with the combination of a monovalent and a trivalent cation i.e. B(II) replaced with B(I) and B(III). Double perovskite nanocrystals such as Cs2AgBiX6 (X = Cl, Br, I),  Cs2AgInCl6 (including Mn-doped variant), and Cs2AgInxBi1−xCl6 (including Na-doped variant) have been studied as potential alternatives to lead-halide perovskites, although none exhibit narrow, high PLQY emission.

See also 

 Quantum Dots
 Perovskites
 Perovskite (structure)
 Light-emitting diode (LED)
 Methylammonium lead halide
 nanocrystal
 nanomaterials
 Semiconductors
 Optoelectronics

References 

Materials science
Nanomaterials
Perovskites